John Charles Cutting is a British psychiatrist specialising in schizophrenia research. He has written a number of books, and articles and reviews in professional journals, on the subjects of psychiatry, clinical psychology, schizophrenia and the functioning of the right cerebral hemisphere of the brain.

Cutting has been an honorary senior lecturer at King's College Hospital in London and the Institute of Psychiatry in London.

Life and career
John Cutting was born in Aberdeen 1952, Scotland, and brought up in Yorkshire, England. He studied and qualified as a doctor of medicine in London and went on to train in psychiatry.

Cutting is a psychiatrist based in London.

Cutting worked as a consultant psychiatrist at Maudsley Hospital, London and Bethlem Royal Hospital, a specialist psychiatric facility at Beckenham in the London Borough of Bromley, and the Institute of Psychiatry in London for 20 years. He has been an honorary senior lecturer at King's College Hospital, London and the Institute of Psychiatry.

Since the early 1990s, Cutting "has been studying philosophy with the aim of contributing to the growing discipline of philosophical psychopathology – explaining conditions such as schizophrenia and depression in philosophical terms."

He has written a number of books, and articles and reviews in professional journals, on the subjects of psychiatry, clinical psychology, psychopathology, schizophrenia and the functioning of the right cerebral hemisphere of the brain.

In September 2005, Cutting was a speaker at a two-day international conference in London, at the Institute of Psychiatry, entitled "Phenomenology and Psychiatry for the 21st Century."

Awards
In 1977, whilst he was working at the Maudsley Hospital, Cutting won The Gaskell Medal and Prize from the Royal College of Psychiatrists.

Influence
Speaking in an interview with Frontier Psychiatrist, Iain McGilchrist, author of The Master and His Emissary, a book about the world views of the two hemispheres of the brain, stated: "What I began to see – and it was John Cutting's work on the right hemisphere that set me thinking – was that the difference lay not in what they do, but how they do it."

Selected publications

Books
 (Hardcover)
 (Hardcover)
 (Paperback)

 (Paperback)
 (Paperback)
 (Hardcover)
 (Paperback)

Books edited
 (Hardcover)

Journal articles
.

.
.

.
 E- Print .
. 
 E- Print .

Translations

 (Paperback)

References

                   

Living people
British psychiatrists
British medical writers
Schizophrenia researchers
Date of birth missing (living people)
Year of birth missing (living people)